The Central District of Dorud County is a district (bakhsh) in Dorud County, Lorestan Province, Iran. At the 2006 census, its population was 144,130, in 33,008 families.  The District has one city: Dorud. The District is subdivided into three Rural Districts: Dorud Rural District, Heshmatabad Rural District, and Zhan Rural District.

References 

Districts of Lorestan Province
Dorud County